Maria Anna Josepha of Bavaria (Maria Anna Josepha Augusta; 7 August 1734 – 7 May 1776) was a Duchess of Bavaria by birth and Margravine of Baden-Baden by marriage. She was nicknamed the savior of Bavaria. She is also known as Maria Josepha and is sometimes styled as a princess of Bavaria.

Biography

Maria Anna Josepha was born at the Nymphenburg Palace in 1734. She was the fifth child of Charles Albert, Elector of Bavaria (later Holy Roman Emperor) and his wife Maria Amalia of Austria. She was baptised with the names Maria Anna Josepha Augusta. A member of the House of Wittelsbach, rulers of the Electorate of Bavaria, she was styled a Duchess of Bavaria.

She married Louis George of Baden-Baden, the ruling Margrave of Baden-Baden and son of the late Louis William of Baden-Baden and his wife Sibylle of Saxe-Lauenburg, the latter was the regent of Baden-Baden for the infant Louis George. The couple were married at the Schloss Ettlingen in Baden on 20 July 1755; the bride was aged 20, the groom 53. The couple remained childless; although Louis George did have one surviving daughter, Elisabeth, from his previous marriage, but as a female she was barred from the succession to the Margraviate.

Her husband had been married previously to Maria Anna of Schwarzenberg by whom he had four children but only one survived infancy. Maria Anna was the only daughter of Prince Adam Franz Karl of Schwarzenberg and Eleonora of Lobkowicz.

Her husband died in 1761 and was succeeded by his brother Augustus George, Margrave of Baden-Baden. As such, his wife the Belgian born Maria Victoire d'Arenberg became the most important female at the court of Baden-Baden.

Maria Anna developed a great passion for diplomacy. She forged links with Frederick II of Prussia in order to protect the Bavarian throne as her brother, Maximilian III Joseph, was childless and feared for the succession.

As a widow, Maria Anna Josepha returned to her native Bavaria where she died at the Nymphenburg Palace in Munich, over a year before her brother. She was buried at the Theatine Church, Munich, traditional burial place of Bavarian royalty.

Ancestors

References

External links

|-

German royalty
1734 births
1776 deaths
18th-century German people
18th-century German women
German princesses
House of Wittelsbach
Margravines of Baden-Baden
Nobility from Munich
House of Zähringen
Duchesses of Bavaria
Burials at the Theatine Church, Munich
Daughters of emperors
Children of Charles VII, Holy Roman Emperor
Daughters of kings